Javier Ozmar Sánchez Orozco (born February 9, 1993, in Mexico City) is a Mexican professional footballer who last played for Pioneros de Cancún. He made his professional debut with Atlante during a Liga MX defeat to Chiapas on 24 April 2014.

External links
 
 

Living people
1994 births
Mexican footballers
Association football midfielders
Atlante F.C. footballers
Deportivo Nuevo Chimalhuacán footballers
Inter Playa del Carmen players
Pioneros de Cancún footballers
Liga MX players
Liga Premier de México players
Footballers from Mexico City